The Women's Discus Throw at the 1984 Summer Olympics in Los Angeles, California had an entry list of 17 competitors, with two qualifying groups before the final (12) took place on August 11, 1984.

Medalists

Abbreviations

Records

Qualifying round
Held on 1984-08-10

Final

See also
 1982 Women's European Championships Discus Throw (Athens)
 1983 Women's World Championships Discus Throw (Helsinki)
 1984 Women's Friendship Games Discus Throw (Prague)
 1986 Women's European Championships Discus Throw (Stuttgart)
 1987 Women's World Championships Discus Throw (Rome)

References

External links
  Official Report
 Results

D
Discus throw at the Olympics
1984 in women's athletics
Women's events at the 1984 Summer Olympics